Ignatzschineria cameli is a Gram-negative and non-motile bacterium from the genus of Ignatzschineria which has been isolated from necrotic foot tissue of a dromedary.

References

Alteromonadales
Bacteria described in 2018